Vladimir Štengl (born July 30, 1942 in Vukovar) is a Croatian politician. 

From 1997 to 2001 he was mayor of Vukovar. He also served as president of the government of the city of Vukovar. He is a member of the Croatian Democratic Union party. 

He became known for lengthy and controversial lawsuit against Vukovarac.net internet portal.

References

External links 
 Vladimir Štengl - mayor of Vukovar
 List of mayors of Vukovar
 Štengl biography at Croatian parliament
 Lawsuit details

1942 births
Living people
Mayors of Vukovar
Croatian Democratic Union politicians
Representatives in the modern Croatian Parliament
Mayors of places in Croatia
Faculty of Science, University of Zagreb alumni